Ub is a town and municipality located in the Kolubara District of western Serbia. As of 2011, the population of the town is 6,164, while population of the municipality is 29,022 inhabitants.

History
The first communities established at the municipal territory of Ub, according to the historical traces and traces of human civilization discovered in the current settlements of Trlić, Kalinovac, Brgule, originated from the time of Vinča culture, in the period around 5000 BC. In the settlement of Čučuge today there are traces of the Bronze Age.
 
The most probable theory of the origin of the name is from the Latin word "urb", meaning "city". According to  legends, the place was built in the reign of Prince Kocelj, and it was named after his brother Slavoljub. Over time, the names shortened to just "Ub".
 
The most important of the cultural and historical monuments of Ub is certainly the church - monastery in the village Dokmir, dating from the fifteenth century. Research suggests that the monastery was restored in 1415, so it is thought that the monastery dates from an earlier period.  Also affiliated with the monastery are the nuns of the monastery Žitomislić in Herzegovina, who had fled from the horrors of war in Bosnia in early '90s.
 
The Tamnava area has preserved evidences of earlier styles and ways of life. In the mountain areas were fortresses, monasteries, churches and towers, and it is often difficult to reach such areas, but in the plains, monuments and buildings were often removed, leaving little trace, barely sufficient to preserve some features of the old life.

Settlements
Apart from the town of Ub, the municipality consists of the following villages (2002 population given in parentheses):

 Banjani (1395)
 Bogdanovica (348)
 Brezovica (668)
 Brgule (1235)
 Crvena Jabuka (631)
 Čučuge (463)
 Dokmir (558)
 Gunjevac (497)
 Gvozdenović (468)
 Joševa (455)
 Kalenić (888)
 Kalinovac (480)
 Kožuar (708)
 Kršna Glava (221)
 Liso Polje (278)
 Lončanik (551)
 Milorci (407)
 Murgaš (Ub) (559)
 Novaci (879)
 Paljuvi (769)
 Pambukovica (1173)
 Radljevo (607)
 Raduša (297)
 Ruklada (372)
 Šarbane (545)
 Slatina (413)
 Sovljak (1933)
 Stublenica (999)
 Takovo (979)
 Trlić (1020)
 Trnjaci (909)
 Tulari (945)
 Tvrdojevac (402)
 Vrelo (1684)
 Vrhovine (552)
 Vukona (262)
 Zvizdar (536)

Demographics

According to the 2011 census results, the municipality of Ub has 29,101 inhabitants. Of these, the urban settlement of Ub has a population of 6,164 inhabitants, while the other settlements have a range of population. The larger villages are Banjani, Vrelo, Takovo, Pambukovica and Sovljak.

Ethnic groups
In addition to Serbs who make up almost 95% of the population, there were also significant Romani community with 3.8% of total population. The ethnic composition of the municipality:

Education
There are four elementary schools in the municipality, with around 2,270 students (as of 2010). Secondary education facilities in the municipality of Ub are Gymnasium "Branislav Petronijević" with 190 students and Technical School "Ub" with 448 students (as of 2010). Students profile and interests that are acquired at the end of school (grammar school is general education profile, while a secondary technical school represented sections: machine in computer design, auto mechanics, body mechanic, waiter, cook, textile worker, trade technician, dealer, locksmith, locksmith and lathe), generally meet the needs of municipalities and the environment, which confirms the high occupancy rate, which generally meet existing needs. Equipment of schools is satisfactory.

Economy and infrastructure
The municipality of Ub is linked through a network of regional roads, allowing a good road connection with the municipal and regional centers that surround it.

The municipality is connected through roads M-4, M-21 M-22 and M-19 with all other towns in Serbia. The road network is in good condition, and in the years to come it is planned expansion and improvement. A projected Belgrade–Bar motorway goes through the territory of Ub. A junction is planned to be built  from the town, in the village of Stublenica,  from Belgrade. Near this area is the projected future industrial zone Ub East.
  
The industrial railway is passing through the territory and serves only to economic activity and to the open pit mines Kolubara.
  
Especially important transportation development opportunities and activities that monitor traffic  can be achieved by building the Belgrade - Southern Adria highway route, which passes near the City of Ub. 

The area of Ub is partially covered by a network of telecommunication facilities. According to the Republican Bureau of Statistics, in 2007 there were 8,920 land phone subscribers.

Economic preview
The following table gives a preview of total number of registered people employed in legal entities per their core activity (as of 2018):

Mineral resources
There are several mines and resource centers of coal (Radljevo field - 344,000,000 tones, Zvizdar field - 280,000,000 tones), clay, sand, stone and limestone.
 
The biggest producer of quartz sand in Serbia is "Kopovi a.d.", with overall production of over 400,000 tones per year. 
 
Clay pits are based below the layers of sand and quartz sand. Municipality of Ub is the biggest supplier of high-quality clay in Serbia. There are more than 1,800,000 tones of clay.

Notable people
 Branislav Petronijević, philosopher
 Dragan Džajić, footballer
 Dušan Savić, footballer
 Sreten Ninković, track and field (marathon runner)
 Radosav Petrović, footballer
 Nemanja Matić, footballer

See also
 Subdivisions of Serbia

References

External links

 Official website

Populated places in Kolubara District
Municipalities and cities of Šumadija and Western Serbia

hr:Ub